The Pages Conservation Park is a protected area in the Australian state of South Australia which is associated with the island group known as The Pages located in Backstairs Passage about  south-east of Cape Jervis and about  south south-west of the state capital of Adelaide.

The conservation park consists of the island group and adjoining waters. The islands first acquired protected area status as a fauna conservation reserve proclaimed under the Crown Lands Act 1929. On 27 April 1972, the fauna conservation reserve was reconstituted as The Pages Conservation Park under the National Parks and Wildlife Act 1972. On 24 December 1997, the boundary of the conservation park was extended  seawards in order to control berleying associated with both shark cage diving and shark fishing.

In 1980, the conservation park was described as follows:Two small islands and a reef which have some aesthetic significance.  The islands support a large breeding colony of Australian sea lions and have long been recognised as an important area for seabirds…  
Two small rocky islands and a reef in Backstairs Passage.  The islands are predominantly rock though their relatively flat tops support a low open shrubland of Senecio lautus with widely scattered Atriplex sp and Bulbinopsis bulbosa in small pockets of soil.  Steeper slopes support a mat of Disphyma clavellatum and occasional Enchylaena tomentosa…  
The isolation, absence of introduced species and only occasional human visits, has ensured habitat preservation.

The conservation park is classified as an IUCN Category IA protected area.  In 1980, it was listed on the now-defunct Register of the National Estate.

See also
Protected areas of South Australia
Page (disambiguation)

References

External links
The Pages Conservation Park web page on protected planoet

Conservation parks of South Australia
South Australian terrestrial protected areas with a marine zone
Protected areas established in 1967
1967 establishments in Australia
Backstairs Passage
South Australian places listed on the defunct Register of the National Estate